Life is a British drama television series by the BBC, written by Mike Bartlett. It was first broadcast on 29 September 2020. The series follows the residents of four flats who live in a converted Victorian house, with an ensemble cast led by Alison Steadman and Peter Davison. Melissa Johns and Adrian Lester also star, with Victoria Hamilton reprising her role as Anna Baker – now known as Belle Stone – from Bartlett's series Doctor Foster. Her ex-husband Neil Baker (Adam James) reprises his role for three of the six episodes.

Cast

 Alison Steadman as Gail Reynolds, Henry's 70-year-old wife who becomes discontented with her marriage
 Peter Davison as Henry Reynolds, Gail's husband
 Adrian Lester as David Aston, a recently widowed English Literature tutor 
 Rachael Stirling as Kelly Aston, David's recently deceased wife who appears to him as a ghost
 Saira Choudhry as Saira Malik, one of David's students
 Victoria Hamilton as Belle Stone, a divorced woman previously known as Anna Baker (see Doctor Foster)
 Erin Kellyman as Maya Stone, Ruth's daughter who moves in with Belle
 Melissa Johns as Hannah Taylor, a pregnant woman who is in a relationship with Liam
 Calvin Demba as Andy, the father of Hannah's child
 Joshua James as Liam Banner, Hannah's fiancé
 Susannah Fielding as Ruth Stone, Belle's sister who is sectioned
 Adam James as Neil Baker, Belle's ex-husband (see Doctor Foster)
 Elaine Paige as Helen, an old friend of Henry and Gail

Episodes

References

External links 
 
 

2020 British television series debuts
2020s British drama television series
BBC television dramas
English-language television shows
Television shows set in Manchester
BBC high definition shows